The 1961 Star World Championships were held in San Diego, United States in 1961.

Results

References

Star World Championships
1961 in sailing
Star World Championships in the United States